Mateo Lucas Vidal Medina (17 October 1780 in Montevideo – 8 January 1855 in Buenos Aires) was a Uruguayan priest and politician.

Elected deputy to the Assembly of the Year XIII. Later he took part in the Constituent Assembly that drafted the Argentine Constitution of 1826. His remains are buried at La Recoleta Cemetery.

References

1780 births
1855 deaths
University of Charcas alumni
19th-century Uruguayan Roman Catholic priests
Uruguayan politicians
Burials at La Recoleta Cemetery